

Participating teams

Groups formed
The draw resulted in the following groups:

Format
The 16 teams were drawn into four groups of four teams and played a round-robin. The best placed team advanced to the quarterfinal, while the second-and third best team advanced to the playoffs. The last placed team played in placement games for place 13–16. From the quarterfinals on, a knockout system was used to determine the winner. The losers of the playoffs and quarterfinals played in placement games to determine their final position.

Preliminary round

Group A

Group B

Group C

Group D

Knockout stage

Championship bracket

5th place bracket

9th place bracket

13th place bracket

Playoffs

Quarterfinals

13th–16th place semifinals

9th–12th place semifinals

5th–8th place semifinals

Semifinals

15th place game

13th place game

Eleventh place game

Ninth place game

Seventh place game

Fifth place game

Third place game

Final

Final ranking

Medalists

Individual awards
Most Valuable Player
 Duško Pijetlović

Best Goalscorer
 Alexandr Axenov – 22 goals

All-Tournament Team
 Josip Pavić
 Duško Pijetlović
 Francesco Di Fulvio
 Ioannis Fountoulis
 Petar Muslim
 Alexandr Axenov
 Aaron Younger

References

External links
16th FINA World Championships 2015 FINA Water Polo website
Official website
Records and statistics (reports by Omega)
 Men Water Polo XVI World Championship 2015 Kazan www.todor66.com

2015
Men